The Charioteer of Delphi, also known as Heniokhos (the rein-holder), is a statue surviving from Ancient Greece, and an example of ancient bronze sculpture. The life-size (1.8m) statue of a chariot driver was found in 1896 at the Sanctuary of Apollo in Delphi. It is now in the Delphi Archaeological Museum.

Background

The statue was set up at Delphi, Greece  to commemorate one of two victories of the tyrant Polyzalus of Gela in Sicily and his chariot in the Pythian Games of either 478 or 474 BC, which were held at Delphi in honor of Pythean Apollo. It has also been suggested that the complex was actually commemorating the victory of Polyzalos' brother, Hieron, at the same games in analogy to his ex voto after his victory at the Olympic Games. 

It was originally part of a larger group of statuary, including the chariot, at least four horses and possibly two grooms. Some fragments of the horses were found with the statue. The masterpiece has been associated with the sculptor Pythagoras of Rhegion who lived and worked in Sicily, as well as with the sculptor Calamis. The Sicilian cities were very wealthy compared with most of the cities of mainland Greece and their rulers could afford the most magnificent offerings to the gods, also the best horses and drivers. It is unlikely, however, the statue itself comes from Sicily. The name of the sculptor is unknown, but for stylistic reasons it is believed that the statue was cast in Athens. It has certain similarities of detail to the statue known as the Piraeus Apollo, which is known to be of Athenian origin.

An inscription on the limestone base of the statue shows that it was dedicated by Polyzalus, the tyrant of Gela, a Greek colony in Sicily, as a tribute to Apollo for helping him win the chariot race. The inscription, that is written in hexameters, reads: [...Π]ολύζαλος μ'ἀνέθηκ[ε... τ]ὸν ἄεξ εὐόνυμ'Ἀπόλλ[ον], which is reconstructed to read "Polyzalus dedicated me. ... Make him prosper, honoured Apollo."

Design and completeness

Most bronze statues from ancient times have long been melted down for their raw materials or were naturally corroded, but the Charioteer survived because it was buried under a rock-fall at Delphi, which probably destroyed the site in 373 B.C..  Some freestanding bronze statues, however, including the charioteer, have been rediscovered in the 20th century.  On discovery the figure exhibited a bluish appearance which correlates with Plutarch's description of the Spartan Monument from Delphi having an "unusual blue and glossy patina, due to peculiarities of the air inside the sanctuary."  After a century of indoor exposure the Charioteer has turned greenish, although the lower torso still preserves a bluish coloration. The statue is almost intact except that his left forearm and some details on the head are missing including the copper inlays on the lips and most of the silver eyelashes and headband. The statue is one of the few Greek bronzes to preserve the inlaid glass eyes. Greek bronzes were cast in sections and then assembled. When discovered, the statue was in three pieces—head and upper torso, lower torso, and right arm.

The figure is of a very young man, as is shown by his soft side-curls. Like modern jockeys, chariot racers were chosen for their lightness, but also needed to be tall, so they were frequently teenagers.  It seems that it represents a teenager from a noble family of his time; aristocratic chariot racers selected their drivers from glorious noble families in the Panhellenic Games. The Charioteer wears the customary long tunic, (the xystís), reaching down to his ankles. A wide belt tightens the tunic high above the waist, while two other bands pass as suspenders over the shoulders, under the arms and criss-cross in the back. This is the analavos which keeps the garment from billowing in the wind during the race. The deep vertical pleats in the lower part of the tunic emphasize the Charioteer’s solid posture, resembling also the fluting of an Ionic column. On the upper part of the body, however, the pleats are wavy, diagonal or curved. This contrast in the garment representation is also followed by the body’s contrapuntal posture, so that the statue does not show any rigidity, but looks perfectly mobile and almost real. The entire statue is as if it is animated by a gradual shift to the right starting from the solid stance of the feet and progressing sequentially through the body passing the hips, chest and head to end up at its gaze. The hands are spread out holding the reins, with the long and thin fingers tightening – together with the reins – a cylindrical object, the riding crop. 

The Charioteer is not portrayed during the race, as in this case his movement would be more intense, but in the end of the race, after his victory, when – being calm and full of happiness – he makes the victory lap in the hippodrome. His attractive gemstone eyes evoke what Classical period Greeks called ethos and greatness. His motion is instantaneous, but also eternal. In spite of the great victory, there are no shouts, but a inner power. The face and the body do not have any instability, those have a great self-confidence.

Unusually for this era, the Charioteer is clothed head to foot. Most athletes at this time would have competed, and been depicted nude. The young man would certainly have been of a lower status than his master Polyzalos, and Honour and Fleming have speculated that he may have been a household slave whom it was not appropriate to depict in the nude.

Style
Stylistically, the Charioteer is classed as "Early Classical" or "Severe" (see Greek art). The statue is more naturalistic than the kouroi of the Archaic period, but the pose is still very rigid when compared with later works of the Classical period. One departure from the Archaic style is that the head is inclined slightly to one side. The naturalistic rendering of his feet was greatly admired in ancient times. The introverted expression does away with the old 'Archaic smile'.

The Delphos gown
In about 1907, some ten years after the discovery of the Charioteer, Mariano Fortuny y Madrazo, a Spanish artist-designer based in Venice, created a finely pleated silk dress that he named the Delphos gown after the statue, whose robes it closely resembled. These gowns are considered important pieces of early 20th century fashion and art objects in their own right. A Delphos gown was, in 2003, the only fashion garment in the collection of the Museum of Modern Art, New York.

Gallery

References

External links

 Charioteer of Delphi. Ancient Greece.
 Charioteer of Delphi. University of Saskatchewan.
 

1896 archaeological discoveries
5th-century BC Greek sculptures
Ancient chariot racing
Ancient Greek athletic art
Ancient Greek bronze statues of the classical period
Archaeological discoveries in Greece
Bronze sculptures in Greece
Carriage drivers
Collection of the Delphi Archaeological Museum
Sculptures in Delphi
Sculptures of men in Greece
Statues in Greece